Rogelio Marcelo García (born June 11, 1965 in Guantánamo) is a retired boxer from Cuba, who competed in the light flyweight (– 48 kg) division during the early 1990s.

Marcelo lost in 1989 and 1991 at the world championships finals to American winner Eric Griffin but represented his native country at the 1992 Summer Olympics in Barcelona, Spain, where he won the gold medal (Griffin lost to Rafael Lozano 5-6 ). A year earlier, at the Pan Am Games in Havana, Cuba, he had triumphed in the same division.

Olympic results
 Defeated Mfamasibili Mnisi (Swaziland) RSC 3 (0:55)
 Defeated Erdenentsogt Tsogtjargal (Mongolia) 14-2
 Defeated Rafael Lozano (Spain) 11-3
 Defeated Roel Velasco (Philippines) RSC 1 (1:36)
 Defeated Daniel Bojinov (Bulgaria) 24-10

References
 databaseOlympics.com
 Profile

1965 births
Living people
Flyweight boxers
Boxers at the 1991 Pan American Games
Boxers at the 1992 Summer Olympics
Olympic boxers of Cuba
Olympic gold medalists for Cuba
Sportspeople from Guantánamo
Olympic medalists in boxing
Cuban male boxers
AIBA World Boxing Championships medalists
Medalists at the 1992 Summer Olympics
Pan American Games gold medalists for Cuba
Pan American Games medalists in boxing
Competitors at the 1986 Central American and Caribbean Games
Competitors at the 1990 Central American and Caribbean Games
Central American and Caribbean Games gold medalists for Cuba
Central American and Caribbean Games silver medalists for Cuba
Central American and Caribbean Games medalists in boxing
Medalists at the 1991 Pan American Games